František Hájek (31 October 1915 – 7 January 2001) was a Czech basketball player. He competed in the men's tournament at the 1936 Summer Olympics.

References

1915 births
2001 deaths
Czech men's basketball players
Olympic basketball players of Czechoslovakia
Basketball players at the 1936 Summer Olympics
Sportspeople from Prague